Pascal Simon (born 27 September 1956) is a retired French road racing cyclist. A native of Mesnil St. Loup, he was a professional cyclist from 1979 to 1991. Pascal was the oldest of four brothers that all became professional cyclists: Régis, Jerôme and François.

In 1983, Simon obtained the yellow jersey while riding for Cycles Peugeot after the tenth stage of the Tour de France. One day later, Simon fell down and broke his shoulder. Simon continued for six more days, before the injury forced him out of the race.

Major results

1979
Montauroux
1980
Tour du Haut Var
1981
Tour de l'Avenir
1983
 Boucles de Sospel
 Dauphiné Libéré: Stage 6
 Lisieux
1984
 Route du Sud
 Joigny
1986
 Tour du Haut Var
1988
 Châteauroux - Limoges

Tour de France 
1980 - 28th
1982 - 20th, winner of 15th stage
1983 - did not finish, 7 days in yellow jersey
1984 - 7th
1985 - 20th
1986 - 13th
1987 - 53rd
1988 - 17th
1989 - 13th
1990 - 35th
1991 - 57th

External links 

French male cyclists
Living people
Cyclists from Grand Est
1956 births
French Tour de France stage winners